Central do Brasil is a major train station in the Brazilian city of Rio de Janeiro. It is the last stop of Rio's railway network, as well as a hub for connection with the city subway and a bus station. Central do Brasil was also a preeminent stop in the interstate Central do Brasil railroad, which linked Rio de Janeiro with São Paulo and Minas Gerais, though the railroad is now deactivated. The station is located in downtown Rio de Janeiro, along the Avenida Presidente Vargas and across from the Campo de Santana park. It was built in Art Deco style.

References

External links

 Photo Album of the Brazilian Railroads

Metrô Rio stations
SuperVia stations
Art Deco architecture in Brazil
Transport infrastructure completed in 1937